Sergant Ruescott Melshi is a fictional character from the Star Wars franchise. A human male in the Alliance to Restore the Republic Special Forces during the early stages of the Galactic Civil War. The character first appears in Lucasfilm's Rogue One: A Star Wars Story (2016) and again in the Disney+ television series Andor (2022). Melshi has also been in Star Wars books, audiobooks, and a video game.

Sometime before joining the Rebel Alliance, Melshi was an Imperial prisoner on Narkina 5. While working in Unit Five-Two, he met Cassian Andor and they broke out together. Later, Melshi led a rebel extraction team to rescue of Jyn Erso from the Imperial labor camp on the planet Wobani. Melshi then helped Andor in putting together the motley crew of volunteers known as "Rogue One." The team went on a one-way mission to steal the Death Star plans, which were being held in the Imperial security facility on Scarif. Erso, Andor, Melshi, and the other members of Rogue One were able to grab the plans, but they all sacrificed their lives in the mission.

Depiction
Ruescott Melshi first appeared in the 2016 Star Wars Anthology film Rogue One: A Star Wars Story. Melshi was first revealed in the second trailer for the film on October 13, 2016. In the film, the character was referred to by his last name only; the name "Ruescott" was established in the film's novelisation, released simultaneously with the film on December 16, 2016

The character is portrayed by Duncan Pow, who originally joined the crew working on Rogue One: A Star Wars Story during the early stages of production, assisting with auditions, and was ultimately cast as Melshi. The decision to bring the character back to the franchise in the plot of the Andor television series was made by creator Tony Gilroy. As reported by series writer Beau Willimon in an interview with Collider "I remember Tony talking about how much he [...] was looking for an opportunity to bring Melshi back [...] I don't remember who said it out loud first, but what if Melshi's in that prison? And it's like, "Oh, my god." In an interview with The Hollywood Reporter, Tony Gilroy stated, "I love the character. Duncan Pow, who plays Melshi, was a great hang on Rogue, and I just really liked him. So I was just like, “How can we get him back in?” There will be some other things along the way that we’ll do, but the prison just seemed like a great place to show where and how they meet."

Appearances
As of 12 November 2022, the character has appeared in the following Star Wars media.

Films
Rogue One: A Star Wars Story (First appearance, simultaneous with Rogue One: A Star Wars Story audiobook, Rogue One: A Star Wars Story novelisation, Star Wars: Rogue One: A Junior Novel, First identified as Melshi)

Television

 Andor – "Narkina 5"
 Andor – "Nobody's Listening!"
 Andor – "One Way Out"
 Andor – "Daughter of Ferrix"

Books 

 Star Wars: Rogue One: The Ultimate Visual Guide
 Rebel Rising
 Rogue One: A Star Wars Story novelisation (First identified as Ruescott, simultaneous with Rogue One: A Star Wars Story audiobook, Star Wars: Rogue One: Secret Mission, Star Wars: Rogue One: The Ultimate Visual Guide)
 Star Wars: Rogue One: A Junior Novel
 Star Wars: Rogue One Graphic Novel Adaptation

Comics

 Rogue One Adaptation 1
 Rogue One Adaptation 4
 Rogue One Adaptation 5
 Rogue One Adaptation 6

Audiobooks
 Rebel Rising audiobook
 Rogue One: A Star Wars Story audiobook
 Star Wars: Rogue One: A Junior Novel audiobook

Computer Games

 Star Wars Battlefront: Rogue One: X-wing VR Mission (mention only)

References

Notes

External Links

Fictional military personnel in films
Fictional revolutionaries
Fictional soldiers
Male characters in comics
Male characters in film
Male characters in literature
Male characters in television
Star Wars comics characters
Star Wars literary characters
Star Wars Skywalker Saga characters
Star Wars television characters